Vyšná Hutka is a village and municipality in Košice-okolie District in the Kosice Region of eastern Slovakia.

History
In historical records the village was first mentioned in 1293.

Geography
The village lies at an altitude of 200 metres and covers an area of 3.624 km². The municipality has a population of about 360 people.

External links
https://web.archive.org/web/20080111223415/http://www.statistics.sk/mosmis/eng/run.html 

Villages and municipalities in Košice-okolie District